Hazel Reeves, MRSS SWA FRSA is a British sculptor based in Sussex, England, who specialises in figure and portrait commissions in bronze. Her work has been shown widely across England and Wales. Public commissions can be found in Carlisle, London and Manchester.

Early life and education 
Reeves was born in Croydon, Surrey and now lives in Brighton, East Sussex. She attended Imberhorne School in East Grinstead, West Sussex, Kingston Business School and the London School of Economics and Political Science (LSE) to study international development and gender equality MSc (Econ). In 2003 she studied sculpture with Sylvia MacRae Brown at the University of Sussex, at Heatherley School of Fine Art (London) and in 2009 at the Florence Academy of Art, Italy.

Career 
Reeves' first quasi-public commission was of Sadako Sasaki for the Hedd Wen Peace Place, Llanfoist, Abergavenny, unveiled on the World Day of Peace, 21st September 2012. It tells the story of Sadako and her 1000 paper cranes, used worldwide in peace education.  

The statue of Sir Nigel Gresley, designer of steam locomotives Flying Scotsman and Mallard, was Reeves' first major public commission. Her original design had included a mallard duck but it was removed after objections from two relatives who thought it was demeaning. The statue was unveiled at London King's Cross railway station on 6 April 2016, the 75th anniversary of his death. 

On International Women's Day, 8 March 2018, Reeves' Cracker Packers statue was unveiled in Caldewgate, Carlisle, close to the pladis factory, where Carr's Table Water Biscuits are manufactured. The statue celebrates the lives of women biscuit factory workers from the Carr's factory in Carlisle. Based on former and current Cracker Packers the statue is of two women factory workers, one from the past and one from the present, standing atop a giant Carr's Table Water Biscuit. The statue was commissioned by Carlisle City Council and was one of hundreds that were nominated for Historic England's "Immortalised" season in 2018. Efforts to redress the lack of representation of women in Britain's statuary have involved some of her work.

In 2017, Reeves' winning design – Rise up, women – was selected from a shortlist of six designs for a bronze statue of Emmeline Pankhurst, by winning the public vote and being the unanimous choice of the WoManchester Statue Project selection panel. The statue of Emmeline Pankhurst was unveiled in St Peter's Square, Manchester (her hometown) on 14 December 2018. In 2021 it won the Public Statues and Sculpture Association (PSSA) Marsh Award for Excellence in Public Sculpture.

Reeves was artist-in-residence in 2021 at Knepp Estate, West Sussex, recording bird soundscapes to inspire movement. Her resultant Sculptural Murmurings project is funded by the National Lottery through Arts Council England. Reeves' statue of Elizabeth Wolstenholme Elmy was unveiled in Congleton by Baroness Hale of Richmond on International Women's Day, 8 March 2022. 

Reeves was elected to the Society of Women Artists (SWA) in 2009, elected a Fellow of the Royal Society of Arts (RSA) in 2010 and elected a member of the Royal Society of Sculptors (MRSS) in 2017. She teaches portrait sculpture workshops at the Sussex Sculpture Studios in Billingshurst, Phoenix Brighton, Morley College (London) and Masterclasses at the Art Academy (London).

References

External links

  
 
 
 
 
 

Living people
Year of birth missing (living people)
21st-century British sculptors
21st-century British women artists
21st-century English women
Alumni of Kingston University
Alumni of the London School of Economics
Alumni of the University of Sussex
Artists from Brighton
English sculptors
English women sculptors
People from Croydon